Release Me is the second album by The Like, released in 2010 by Geffen Records under license to Downtown Records in the United States and international markets including the United Kingdom. It features the singles "Release Me" and "He's Not a Boy". The songs "Don't Make a Sound" is featured in the closing credits of the 2010 film The Next Three Days and "Walk of Shame" in the 2011 television film Mean Girls 2. Release Me has a 60s girl group inspired sound, described by one critic as "the Shangri-las as if they were backed (by) The Kinks".

Track listing

"Don't Make a Sound" is followed by a hidden track, "Why When Love is Gone", a song originally written by Ivory Joe Hunter.

Personnel

 Elizabeth "Z" Berg -  guitar, vocals
 Tennessee Thomas -  drums, background vocals
 Alex Greenwald -  bass, additional production
 Victor Axelrod -  organ
 Mark Ronson -  production
 Thomas Brenneck -  mastering
 Shawn Everett -  Engineering, mixing
Note: Laena Geronimo and Annie Monroe are credited as bass and organ players respectively, but do not appear on the album.

References

External links
The Like official website
The Like on MySpace
Geffen Records

The Like albums
2010 albums
Geffen Records albums
Albums produced by Mark Ronson

no:Release Me